In the name of God may refer to:

Sa Ngalan ng Diyos, a Tagalog-language novel's title meaning "In The Name of God"
Basmala, an Arabic phrase meaning "In the name of God, the Merciful, the Compassionate"
Khuda Kay Liye, an Urdu-language film, title translated as "In the name of God"
"In the Name of God", an episode of Touched by an Angel
Ram ke Naam (English: In the name of God) a 1992 documentary film by Anand Patwardhan
In the name of God (sculpture), a project launched by Jens Galschiøt
"In the Name of God (Deus Vult)", a song by Powerwolf from the album Preachers of the Night
"In the Name of God", a song by Sabaton from the album Attero Dominatus
"In the Name of God", a song by Dream Theater from the album Train of Thought
"In the Name of God", a song by Slayer from the album Diabolus in Musica

See also
 Names of God
 In the Name of God, Welcome to Planet Genocide, a 2006 EP by The Meads of Asphodel